Georgios Tofas (born 17 June 1989) is a Cypriot footballer who played for Enosis Neon Paralimni as a striker.

Career
Tofas made his debut for Enosis Paralimni first team at 15, he was then called into the Cyprus U16 squad. He made nine substitute appearances for Paralimni in the 2006–07 season.

Aged 17, he signed for AEK Athens for two years, he went straight into the first team squad and trained with players like Rivaldo, Akis Zikos, where he impressed the then coach Lorenzo Serra Ferrer the former Barcelona coach. He then progressed to play for Cyprus at all levels up to under-21 from under-16.

He was spotted playing mostly in AEK Athens U-21 team and went to Middlesbrough in January 2009 and after a week's trial was promptly offered a loan contract until the end of the season with a view to buy him, but this fell through. He then signed for Anorthosis in January with the same deal as he was offered at Middlesbrough; a loan until the end of the season.

Tofas has also been called into the Cyprus national squad for the World Cup qualifiers in March.

On 2 November 2010, Tofas signed for Queens Park Rangers (QPR) on a deal until the end of the 2010–11 season. He made his debut for QPR against Norwich City on 1 January 2011.
 
He was promoted to Premier League with QPR as champions of the Football League Championship in the 2010–11 season. On 1 June 2011, Tofas was one of eight players to be released by QPR manager, Neil Warnock.

References

External links

1989 births
Living people
Cypriot footballers
Cypriot expatriate footballers
Enosis Neon Paralimni FC players
AEK Athens F.C. players
Anagennisi Karditsa F.C. players
Anorthosis Famagusta F.C. players
Queens Park Rangers F.C. players
Anagennisi Deryneia FC players
Super League Greece players
English Football League players
Expatriate footballers in England
Expatriate footballers in Greece
Association football forwards
Cypriot expatriate sportspeople in Greece
Cypriot expatriate sportspeople in England
People from Larnaca